The 2016 All England Super Series Premier was the first Super Series tournament of the 2016 BWF Super Series. The tournament took place in Birmingham, England, from 8 to 13 March 2016 and had a total purse of $550,000.

Men's singles

Seeds

Top half

Bottom half

Finals

Women's singles

Seeds

Top half

Bottom half

Finals

Men's doubles

Seeds

Top half

Bottom half

Finals

Women's doubles

Seeds

Top half

Bottom half

Finals

Mixed doubles

Seeds

Top half

Bottom half

Finals

References

External links
Official website

All England Open Badminton Championships
2016 BWF Super Series
All England
International sports competitions in Birmingham, West Midlands
March 2016 sports events in the United Kingdom